Igor Vozyakov is an art collector, and is the founder of  Ryabushinsky Museum of Icons and Paintings (Former museum "Icon House").

Man of the Year in Ukraine in 2011.

Donated an ancient icon "Protection of the Holy Virgin" (16th century) as a gift to Ukraine on July 12, 2011.

Career 
Was born 19 of October 1967 in Khabarovsk region, Russia

1984-1991 — Ufa Oil University (UNI)

1991 – Operational Engineer of oil products export in Bashneft Export

1992 – Operational Director in Bashneft Export

1994-1999 – Head of Department of commodity-exchange operations in Lukoil

1994-1999 – Deputy Chef of supply in Lukoil

1994-1999 – Director of Strategic management in Lukoil

1999-2004  – Deputy Vice-President of Finance and Economics in Transneft

1999-2004 – Chairman of Board Directors in Stroyneft

2004-2009  — Investment business in development

2009 –  until now — Founder of Ryabushinsky Museum of Icons and Paintings

Museum and Collection 
Main part of the collection is presented in Ryabushinsky Museum of Icons and Paintings with ap. 2,000 items  starting from Fayum portrait and icons ranging from the fifteenth through twentieth centuries, covering iconography centers of Russia, Italy, Spain, Flemish Belgium and Flanders masters and cultural heritage pieces.

Igor Vozyakov was the first who exhibited in 2004 frauds by major Russian artists such as Ivan Aivazovsky, Nicholas Roerich, Konstantin Korovin and other famed painters which he accidentally found in his collection.

Personal life 
From 2004 lives between Spain and London.

Married, with a family of six children:
 Elizabeth Vozyakova (1998)
 Sofiya Vozyakova (1999)
 Ivan Vozyakov (2000)
 Vasily Vozyakov (2001)
 Maria Vozyakova (2015)
 Michael Vozyakov (2018)

References

Year of birth missing (living people)
Living people
Museum founders
People from Khabarovsk
Russian businesspeople in the oil industry